A  is a type of bokken, a wooden practice sword originating in Japan and used in Japanese martial arts. Suburi (素振り; literally, "basic or plain swing") means "practice swing"; a suburitō is therefore used to practice sword-swinging.

Description and use
The suburitō is much thicker at the blade than the handle which makes the suburitō much heavier than a normal bokken. Suburitō are used for practicing suburi (sword swinging exercises) and kata (prearranged exercises). The weight of the suburitō is used for strengthening and conditioning in addition to development of spirit. The suburitō is used to perfect individual technique as well.

A suburitō is commonly around 115 cm (45 in) in length, with a mass of 1 kg (2.2 lb). However, these bokuto can vary widely in size and weight. Suburitō generally do not include a guard.

Legend has it that Miyamoto Musashi carved a bokken that resembled a suburitō out of a boat oar as he traveled to his famous duel with Sasaki Kojiro, whom he supposedly killed.

References

Practice swords of Japan